Rita Williams (born January 14, 1976) is a former professional basketball player in the Women's National Basketball Association (WNBA). She was the 13th pick in the 1998 WNBA Draft, selected by the Washington Mystics. She attended Mitchell College, and played college basketball for the University of Connecticut.

WNBA Career
In the 2000 WNBA season, Williams had the third most steals per game average (2.38). In the 2001 WNBA season, Williams became the first WNBA All-Star in Indiana Fever history.

Career statistics

WNBA

Regular season

Playoffs

|-
|style="text-align:left;"|2002
|style="text-align:left;"|Houston
| 3 || 0 || 23.0 || .320 || .286 || – || 2.0 || 2.3 || 1.0 || 0.0 || 0.3 || 6.7

Personal life
Williams earned a degree in sociology from University of Connecticut.

See also
List of WNBA All-Stars
List of Connecticut Huskies in the WNBA Draft

References

External links
WNBA.com All-Star 2001: Ask the All-Stars: Rita Williams

1976 births
Living people
American women's basketball players
Basketball players from Connecticut
Guards (basketball)
Houston Comets players
Indiana Fever players
Seattle Storm players
UConn Huskies women's basketball players
Washington Mystics draft picks
Washington Mystics players
Women's National Basketball Association All-Stars